A Colour Symphony, Op. 24, F. 106, was written by Arthur Bliss in 1921–22.  It was his first major work for orchestra, and is today one of his best-known compositions.

Orchestration 
The symphony is scored for 3 flutes (one doubling on piccolo), 2 oboes, cor anglais, 2 clarinets, bass clarinet, 2 bassoons, double bassoon, 4 horns, 3 trumpets, 3 trombones, tuba, 2 tympanists, cymbals, 2 harps and strings.

History

A Colour Symphony was written to be performed at the Three Choirs Festival, held in 1922 in Gloucester, at the invitation of Sir Edward Elgar, who also invited Herbert Howells and Eugene Goossens to write a piece each. Howells wrote Sine Nomine for wordless chorus, which was not given its second performance until his centenary year 70 years later, in 1992. Goossens wrote a piece called Silence for chorus and orchestra. Elgar's own contribution was his orchestration of Johann Sebastian Bach's Fantasia and Fugue in C minor.

Bliss decided to write a symphony, but was at first undecided what the theme or character of the work would be. He could not get started for some weeks. One day, by chance, he came across a book on heraldry in which he read of the symbolic meanings attached to certain colours; this gave him the notion of writing a work about colours. He attempted to give each movement a character corresponding to these meanings, but without attempting to depict the colours themselves.  Bliss dedicated the symphony to the conductor Adrian Boult.

The first performance, with the London Symphony Orchestra, in Gloucester Cathedral on 7 September 1922, was conducted by the composer.  It was not well received at first, due to poor preparation.  The work uses a large orchestra, but the platform was so taken up with the chorus required for other works also being performed, that several instruments had to be omitted. Elgar attended, but found it "disconcertingly modern".  It nevertheless entered the repertoire and has been recorded various times, although it is now an infrequent visitor to concert platforms.

Analysis

The four movements are:

A theme from towards the end of the Red movement was used as the signature tune of the televised "Royal Institution Christmas Lectures".

Revision

In 1932, Bliss revised the codas of the first two movements.  He conducted the revised work himself in a recording with the London Symphony Orchestra in 1955.

The last movement, "Green", was separately published as Pyonepsion.

Other uses
In 1977, a ballet called Royal Offering was created, with music based on A Colour Symphony.

A short extract from the 'Red' movement was used as the opening music to BBC TV coverage of The Proms until 2011.

The British artist Kevin Laycock created a visual piece called Four Movements in Colour, in which he attempted to portray, in colour, the sounds created by Arthur Bliss.  In 2004, Laycock created a series of paintings called Tectonics as a direct response to Bliss's A Colour Symphony using parallel compositional structures.

Select discography 
 Arthur Bliss conducting the London Symphony Orchestra, Decca "Ace of Clubs" ACL 239, 1964, Mono.
 Charles Groves conducting the Royal Philharmonic Orchestra, EMI ASD 3416, 1977, Stereo.
 Vernon Handley conducting the Ulster Orchestra, Chandos Records CHAN 8503, 1987, Digital Stereo.
 Barry Wordsworth conducting the BBC Welsh Symphony Orchestra, Nimbus Records NI 5294, 1991, Digital Stereo.
 David Lloyd-Jones conducting the English Northern Philharmonia, Naxos 8.553460, 1996, Digital Stereo.

References

Sources
 Arthur Bliss, liner notes to the recording by Anthony Collins and the London Symphony Orchestra

Further reading
Hull, Robert H. (July 1, 1931). "Bliss's 'Colour' Symphony Reconsidered." The Monthly Musical Record, vol. 61, no. 727, p. 200.

Bliss
Compositions by Arthur Bliss
1922 compositions
Color